Khawak Pass (elevation ) sits across the route heading to the northwest from near the head of the Panjshir Valley through the Hindu Kush range to northern Afghanistan via Andarab and Baghlan.

This is the route traditionally thought to have been followed by Alexander the Great in the spring of 329 BCE when he led his army from the Kabul Valley across the mountains to Bactria (later Tokharistan in the north). Vincent Smith states that Alexander took his troops across both the Khāwak and the Kaoshān or Kushan Pass. According to some scholars, there is no proof of this.

The Khāwak is most probably the pass used by the famous Chinese Buddhist pilgrim monk, Xuanzang, on his return from India to China in the early-7th century. In 1333 Ibn Battuta crossed the pass on his journey to India. When dictating his account over twenty years later he remembered spreading felt cloth in front of his camels to prevent them sinking into the snow.

It was also crossed by Timur (Tamerlane or Timur the Lame, 1336–1405), and by Captain John Wood on his return journey to the sources of the Oxus in the mid-19th century. It was the easternmost pass leading from the Kabul Valley into northern Afghanistan, and the most popular pass of this region.

It links Charikar and Kabul with Kunduz, Khulm, Mazari Sharif and Termez.

Climate
 
According to the Köppen climate classification, the pass has a tundra climate (ET) with cold to bitterly cold weather year-round.

Footnotes

References
 
 
 

Mountain passes of Afghanistan
Landforms of Baghlan Province